Souq Al-Mubarakiya is a historic souq in Kuwait City, Kuwait. It is one of the oldest souqs in Kuwait, and was a center of trade prior to the discovery of oil.

This popular traditional market is located in Kuwait City, between Abdullah Al-Mubarak, Abdullah Al-Salem & Palestine Streets. This market has been around for at least 200 years. The market was damaged during the Iraqi invasion in 1990, however it was renovated and it got back its traditional flavor.

You can spend hours in this market strolling around and discovering reasonable bargains on heritage goods such as Persian silk carpets, real Arab antiques, perfumes like musk and oud, and traditional costumes. This place is perfect whether you want to shop, eat, or for sightseeing. Al-Mubarakiya features a variety of shops such as dates, honey, spices, sweets, vegetables, fruits, meat, and fish. In addition to a range of shops accessories, gold and silver jewelries. The market also hosts two small museums: Sheikh Mubarak Kiosk and the first pharmacy in Kuwait, and admission is free.

There is a courtyard near Masjid Al-Bahar (Sea Mosque), where you can find traditional cafes brewing their teas over coals, and several small restaurants are lined-up where they serve authentic Arab and Persian food to the customers in the open air. The prices are the cheapest in Kuwait. On hot summer days, water mist is sprayed from pipes over the tables to give you a cooling feeling. A children playground is nearby and shisha is also available.

On 31 March 2022, the market was damaged by a massive fire that destroyed most of the shops.

See also
 Kuwait National Cultural District
 List of museums in Kuwait

References

Buildings and structures in Kuwait City
Retail markets in Kuwait
Museums in Kuwait
Cultural centers in Kuwait
Entertainment venues in Kuwait
History of Kuwait
Kuwaiti culture